The Book of Sui (Suí Shū) is the official history of the Sui dynasty. It ranks among the official Twenty-Four Histories of imperial China. It was written by Yan Shigu, Kong Yingda, and Zhangsun Wuji, with Wei Zheng as the lead author. In the third year of Zhenguan of the Tang dynasty (629), Emperor Taizong of Tang ordered Fang Xuanling to supervise the completion of the Book of Sui, which was being compiled around the same time as other official histories were being written. The Book of Sui was completed in 636 AD, the same year as the Book of Chen was completed.

Contents
The format used in the text follows the composite historical biography format (斷代紀傳體) established by Ban Gu in the Book of the Later Han with three sections: annals (紀), treatises (志), and biographies (傳). The extensive set of 30 treatises, sometimes translated as "monographs", in the Book of Sui was completed by a separate set of authors and added in 656 – 20 years after the original text was completed. The treatises cover the Liang, Chen, Northern Qi, and Northern Zhou dynasties in addition to the Sui. In addition to the Book of Liang and Book of Chen, the Book of Sui is an essential source of information on the subjects covered for those dynasties. The treatises on classics (經籍) are especially important because the Book of Sui is the only standard history including such a section since the Book of Han and contains essential bibliographical information for the period from the Later Han (25–220) to the Sui dynasty. The treatises were initially circulated as a separate set titled "Treatises of the History of the Five Dynasties" (五代史志).

Annals (帝紀)

Treatises (志)

Biographies (列傳)

References

Citations

Sources 
 Works cited

External links 

 Book of Sui 《隋書》 Chinese text with matching English vocabulary

7th-century history books
History books about the Sui dynasty
Tang dynasty literature
Twenty-Four Histories
7th-century Chinese books